John Thomas Patten (27 March 1905 – 12 October 1957) was an Aboriginal Australian civil rights activist and journalist.

Biography
John Patten was born in 1905 to John James Patten and Christina Mary Patten, née Middleton, at Cummeragunja Reserve, an Aboriginal reserve in New South Wales. Patten was educated at public schools in Tumbarumba and West Wyalong, and attended high school at West Wyalong. Following high school, Patten was unsuccessful in joining the Navy and worked for the Sydney Municipal Council. To make ends meet he occasionally worked as a boxer. While boxing at Casino in 1931, Patten married Selina Avery.

During the 1930s he became an experienced organiser and public speaker, speaking regularly on Aboriginal rights at the Domain on Sunday afternoons, along with other Aboriginal activists such as Pearl Gibbs and Tom Foster.

In 1937, Patten co-founded the Aborigines Progressive Association with William Ferguson. As President of the APA Patten organised the 1938 Day of Mourning protest, and led an APA delegation to meet with Joseph Lyons, the Prime Minister. The delegation presented Lyons with Patten and Ferguson's manifesto Aborigines Claim Citizenship Rights, which included Patten's 10-point plan for citizenship rights for Aboriginal people.

In April 1938, Patten established a short-lived monthly newspaper, The Abo Call, the first such Aboriginal-focused publication of its kind.  Due to the Depression however, it folded in September 1938 after six issues due to a shortage of funds.

On 4 February 1939 Patten visited Cummeragunja  at the request of his father, John Patten Snr, who was a resident on the station. Patten addressed a large gathering of the station's residents in relation to the deteriorating conditions and the intimidation to which the residents were being subjected to under the government appointed manager, Arthur McQuiggan. Patten raised the subject of New South Wales government plans for the removal of Aboriginal children and gave clarity to the station's residents regarding their rights. Patten convinced a majority of the station's residents to leave Cummeragunja, in an event which would come to be known as the Cummeragunja walk-off. Patten was then arrested for "inciting Aborigines".

Throughout 1939 Patten led a campaign for Aboriginal people to be able to serve in the Australian armed forces. Previously, Aboriginal people had served in every major Australian conflict, but were required to provide proof that they were of substantial non-Aboriginal ancestry. Following a successful campaign, Patten enlisted in the Australian Army, serving with the 2nd AIF in the Middle East. He was discharged in 1942, returning home with a knee badly damaged by shrapnel.

Death
Patten died in hospital in October 1957 after being involved in a motor vehicle accident in Fitzroy in Melbourne.

References

External links
Jack Patten - Australian Aboriginal Civil Rights Leader, KooriHistory.com
Patten, John Thomas (Jack) (1905 - 1957), Australian Dictionary of Biography
Collaborating for Indigenous Rights: Jack Patten, National Museum of Australia

1905 births
1957 deaths
Australian indigenous rights activists
Australian political journalists
Road incident deaths in Victoria (Australia)
Australian Army personnel of World War II